Loveless is an unincorporated community in DeKalb County, Alabama, United States, it is named after its founder, Dawson Lovelace and located  south-southwest of Fort Payne.

References

Unincorporated communities in DeKalb County, Alabama
Unincorporated communities in Alabama